Ovruch Raion was a raion (district) of Zhytomyr Oblast, northern Ukraine. Its administrative centre was located at Ovruch. The raion was abolished on 18 July 2020 as part of the administrative reform of Ukraine, which reduced the number of raions of Zhytomyr Oblast to four. The area of Ovruch Raion was merged into Korosten Raion. The last estimate of the raion population was

See also
Chernobyl disaster
Chernobyl Exclusion Zone

References

External links

 Find out Ovruch Region @ Ukrainian Travel

Former raions of Zhytomyr Oblast
Chernobyl Exclusion Zone
1923 establishments in Ukraine
Ukrainian raions abolished during the 2020 administrative reform